Parascombrops pellucidus is a species of perciform fish in the Family of Acropomatidae.

Distribution 
They can be found from the Indian Ocean from East Africa and the Red Sea to the Bay of Bengal. They are common on the deep shelf from 179 to 210 m (587 to 689 ft).

Description 
They have 10 dorsal spines, 9 dorsal soft rays, 2 anal spines, and 7 anal soft rays.

Taxonomy 
Parascombrops pellucidus was first formally described in 1889 by the British naturalist Alfred William Alcock (1859-1933) with the type locality given as 16 miles east of the Mahanadi Delta at a depth 68 fathoms in the Bay of Bengal. It is the type species of the genus Parascombrops.

References

pellucidus
Fish described in 1970